The Diego Ibarra Municipality is one of the 14 municipalities (municipios) that makes up the Venezuelan state of Carabobo and, according to the 2011 census by the National Institute of Statistics of Venezuela, the municipality has a population of 104,536.  The town of Mariara is the shire town of the Diego Ibarra Municipality.

Demographics
The Diego Ibarra Municipality, according to a 2007 population estimate by the National Institute of Statistics of Venezuela, has a population of 110,131 (up from 96,983 in 2000). This amounts to 4.9% of the state's population.

Government
The mayor of the Diego Ibarra Municipality is Roger Martinez, elected on November 23, 2008, with 50% of the vote. He replaced Rafael Ruiz Manrique shortly after the elections. The municipality is divided into two parishes; Aguas Calientes and Mariara.

See also
Municipalities of Venezuela

References

Municipalities of Carabobo